Gnatia, Egnatia or Ignatia was an Ancient city of the Messapii, and their frontier town towards the Salentini. As Egnazia Appula it was a medieval bishopric, which remains a Latin Catholic titular see.

It is located near the modern Fasano, in Salento, the southern part of Puglia (Apulia) region in southern Italy.

History 
The first settlement known in the place dates from the Bronze Age (15th century BC). In the 11th century BC it was invaded by the Iapyges, while the Messapic (another Iapyyg tribe) era of the town (as well as for the whole Salento) began in the 8th century BC, to end in the 3rd century BC, with the Roman conquest.
 
It was famed for its solar and fire cult, which was described by Pliny and ridiculed by Horace.

The city, an early bishopric (see below), was abandoned in the Middle Ages due to the spread of malaria in the area, or to Vandal and Saracen attacks, or even given the last blow by Holy Roman Emperor Louis II of Italy (who also conquered Bari on Byzantium in 871).

It is last explicitly mentioned by a Ravenna author about 700, and Benedictine historian Paul the Deacon mentions successor see Monopoli as eagerly contested between Byzantines and Longobards as late as 763.

Ruins 
The ancient city walls were almost entirely destroyed over a century ago to provide building material. The place is famous for the discoveries made in its tombs. A considerable collection of antiquities from Gnatia is preserved at Fasano, though the best are in the museum at Bari.

Ecclesiastical History 
Tradition claims it was evangelized by the Prince of Apostles Saint Peter himself.

An episcopal see named Egnazia Appula was established probably before 400, a suffragan of the Archdiocese of Bari, but suppressed in 545, its territory being reassigned to establish the Diocese of Monopoli, possibly before the city itself was abandoned.

A bishop of (E)Gnatia, Rufentius, participated in the three-part Council of Rome, convened in the 501, 502 and 504 by Pope Symmachus I, and in the council called by Italy's Ostrogoth king Theoderic the Great to judge that Pope but which fully reinstated him.

Apparently the see was restored or the title retained, as three later bishops of Egnazia Appula were recorded, but other documents suggest these may be spurious; even if not, the see was (possibly again) suppressed later :
 Basilius, allegedly attending the Lateran Council of 649, which condemned as heresy Monothelitism
 Eucherius, allegedly elected in 701 and consecrated in 702 by the Metropolitan of the Archdiocese of Benevento-Siponto
 Selperius, allegedly consecrated in 720 the church of San Giovanni de portu aspero in Monopoli, where tradition says (without documented proof) its episcopal see was transferred as Diocese of Monopoli, which may however have been founded as late as the ninth century.

The city and bishopric were in decay since the sixth century Longobards (Lombard) invasion, but the time of its demise remains unclear.

Titular see 
The diocese was nominally restored only in June 2004, as a Latin titular bishopric, under the name Egnazia Appula (Italian), corresponding to Latin Egnatia (in Apulia) / Egnatin(us) in Apulia (Latin adjective).

So far it has had one incumbent, not of the fitting Episcopal (lowest) rank but of Archiepiscopal rank :Titular Archbishop Nicola Girasoli (Italian) (2006.01.24 – ...), as papal diplomat : Apostolic Nuncio (ambassador) to Malawi (2006.01.24 – 2011.10.29), Apostolic Nuncio to Zambia (2006.01.24 – 2011.10.29), Apostolic Nuncio to Antigua and Barbuda (2011.10.29 – ...), Apostolic Nuncio to Bahamas (2011.10.29 – ...), Apostolic Nuncio to Dominica (2011.10.29 – ...), Apostolic Nuncio to Jamaica (2011.10.29 – ...), Apostolic Nuncio to Grenada (2011.10.29 – ...), Apostolic Nuncio to Guyana (2011.10.29 – ...), Apostolic Nuncio to Saint Kitts and Nevis (2011.10.29 – ...), Apostolic Nuncio to Saint Lucia (2011.10.29 – ...), Apostolic Nuncio to Saint Vincent and Grenadines (2011.10.29 – ...), Apostolic Nuncio to Suriname (2011.10.29 – ...), Apostolic Delegate to Antilles (2011.10.29 – ...), Apostolic Nuncio to Barbados (2011.12.21 – ...), Apostolic Nuncio to Trinidad and Tobago (2011.12.21 – ...)

See also 
 Gnathia vases
 List of Catholic dioceses in Italy

Notes

Sources

Citations

Bibliography
 .
 .
 Ecclesiastical history
 Ferdinando Ughelli - Nicolò Coleti, Italia sacra, vol. X, 1722, coll. 74-75
 Francesco Lanzoni, Le diocesi d'Italia dalle origini al principio del secolo VII (an. 604), vol. I, Faenza 1927, p. 302

External links 

 Museo e Parco Archeologico di Egnazia - Official website 
 GCatholic 

Pre-Roman cities in Italy
Roman sites of Apulia
Archaeological sites in Apulia
Fasano
Buildings and structures in the Province of Brindisi
Tourist attractions in Apulia
National museums of Italy